Marenco is an Italian surname, which is a variant of Marengo. It may refer to:

Carlo Marenco (1800–1846), Italian writer
Cookie Marenco, American music producer and sound engineer
Giovanni Battista Marenco (1853–1921), Italian archbishop 
Jean McLean Marenco (born 1984), Panamanian football player
Leopoldo Marenco (1831–1899), Italian writer
Luiz Marenco (born 1964), Brazilian musician
Mario Marenco (born 1933), Italian actor
Romualdo Marenco (1841–1907), Italian composer

See also
Marenco Swisshelicopter SKYe SH09
Marengo (disambiguation)

Italian-language surnames